Ko San (born October 19, 1976) is CEO and founder of TIDE Institute and ATEAM Ventures.

Biography

Ko, San was born in Busan, South Korea.  
A graduate of Hanyoung Foreign Language High School, Ko studied mathematics and cognitive science at Seoul National University. He won a bronze medal at a national amateur boxing tournament in 2004 and climbed a 7,546-meter high mountain in China's Xinjiang Province, Muztagh Ata, the same year. After graduating at Seoul National University, he started working at Samsung Advanced Institute of Technology as a researcher. His research topic was computer vision.

On December 25, 2006, he was chosen as one of two finalists in the Korean Astronaut Program, set to fly as a crew on the Russian Soyuz TMA-12 in April 2008.
On September 5, 2007, the Korean Ministry of Science and Technology chose Ko San over Yi So-Yeon based on performance in tests during training in Russia.  However, on March 10, 2008, this decision was reversed, after the Russian Federal Space Agency asked for a replacement because Ko apparently violated security protocol for maintaining secret information twice at the Yuri Gagarin Cosmonaut Training Center.

After returning from Russia he continued working at Korea Aerospace Research Institute.

He started studying public policy at the John F. Kennedy School of Government at Harvard University in 2010.
Now he is taking a leave of absence from the John F. Kennedy School of Government to run an NGO, TIDE Institute, which he founded in February 2011. In April 2013 he opened Fab Lab Seoul, a public open space where tools for digital fabrication such as 3D printers, CNCs and laser cutters are available for startups and makers.

See also   
Timeline of space travel by nationality
Yi So-yeon

References

External links
Korean Will Go Into Space in 2008
Two astronaut finalists pass medical checks
Spacefacts biography of Ko San

South Korean astronauts
People from Busan
Seoul National University alumni
1976 births
Living people